The 1982 San Diego Chargers season was the team's 23rd year, and 13th in the National Football League. The team had a 10–6 record in 1981. 1982 was a strike-shortened season so the league was divided up into two conferences instead of its normal divisional alignment - the Chargers finished 6-3, qualifying for the playoffs as the #5 seed. Their run ended with a second round loss to the Dolphins. This would be the team's last playoff appearance until 1992.

The 1982 Chargers were the top-scoring team in the NFL. They scored a total of 288 points, 32 per game. They led the league in passing touchdowns (19), rushing touchdowns (15, tied with the Raiders) passing yards (2,927), and yards per attempt (8.9).

The Chargers defense, however, surrendered the most passing yards (2,292), and second-most first downs (119) in the league.

Chargers quarterback Dan Fouts was named the Pro Football Writers of America MVP, and 1982 AP Offensive Player of the Year. While the shortened season prevented him from breaking the passing yardage record for the fourth season in a row, his mark of 320.3 yards per game would not be surpassed until 2011. Wes Chandler missed one game through injury but still led the league with 1,032 receiving yards; his average of 129.0 yards per game remains a record, and his nine touchdown receptions led the league. In support, Kellen Winslow had the second-most receptions (54) and the third-most yards (721) in the NFL; veteran Charlie Joiner saw a small drop-off in production but still contributed 545 yards.

At running back, Chuck Muncie had another strong all-around year, rushing for 569 yards, catching passes for a further 207, and scoring nine touchdowns while throwing for two more. James Brooks added 430 rushing yards and, with his receiving and kick returns, gained a league-leading 1,383 all-purpose yards.

San Diego's defensive line was unchanged, and helped the team rank ninth against the run. Keith Ferguson led the team with 4.5 sacks, half a sack ahead of Gary "Big Hands" Johnson. Three new starters were brought into the defensive backfield in an attempt to strengthen the pass defense, but they were ranked dead last for the second consecutive season. The unit did rank seventh for turnovers with 25; newly-signed free safety Tim Fox led the team with four interceptions. Rolf Benirschke made his lone Pro Bowl after converting 16 of 22 kicks, including all seven of his attempts in the 40-49-yard range.

1982 NFL Draft

Personnel

Staff

Roster

Schedule

Note: Intra-division opponents are in bold text.

Game summaries

Week 1: at Denver Broncos 

San Diego won the turnover battle 6-0 as they defeated their closest rivals from the 1981 AFC West race. The Broncos were stymied by three fumbles in the first half, one of those coming in the Charger red zone. While the San Diego offense wasn't at its best, Benirschke made two of four field goal attempts in before halftime, and another in the 3rd quarter after Bob Gregor had intercepted Craig Morton and Wes Chandler had caught a 40-yard pass from Dan Fouts. Debutant Andre Young added another interception on the next Denver drive, and San Diego drove 88 yards in 13 plays to take a 16-3 lead. Chandler twice lined up in the backfield and converted third downs by running the ball, and Fouts found Scott Fitzkee in the end zone for his only Charger touchdown.

Later, the Broncos block a punt, and reached 2nd and goal at the Charger 3 with about five and a half minutes to play; a fumbled handoff then bounced into the end zone for Mike Preston to make his second fumble recovery of the day. Chandler's 39-yard reception then set up an insurance touchdown, when Chuck Muncie went in from 10 yards out on a sweep.

Young had an interception and recovered two fumbles. Chandler gained 120 yards on just four receptions.

Week 2: at Kansas City Chiefs 

The Charger offense was held to less than 300 yards for the first time in over a year as they slipped to defeat. San Diego were forced to punt on their first possession, and Maury Buford's kick was blocked and recovered in the end zone to set the tone for the first half. Fumbles by Brooks and Fouts set up Chief field goals, a Benirschke kick was wiped out by a holding penalty, and it was 16-0 at the break.

San Diego began the second half in better fashion, forcing a punt and then reaching the Kansas City 17 with a 23-yard Winslow reception. From there, Muncie threw an HB pass to Chandler for the touchdown. Wilbur Young sacked Bill Kenney on the next drive - backed up near to their own goal line, the Chiefs then committed a penalty in their own end zone, resulting in a safety and pulling the Chargers within seven. However, a Fouts interception checked their momentum, and the Chiefs again converted the turnover into three points. Benirschke pulled the Chargers back within range, and they reached Kansas City territory on their next drive, only to be pushed back by a key holding penalty on Russ Washington. They punted, and the Chiefs ran out the final 3:57 by gaining three first downs.

Week 3: at Los Angeles Raiders 

San Diego's first game back after the players' strike saw them blow a 24–0 lead on Monday Night Football. They moved the ball with ease in the first half, opening up with a 72-yard field goal drive, and following that by going 83 yards in just four plays, Dwight Scales scoring with a 29-yard reception. Jim Plunkett was intercepted by Tim Fox and Cliff Thrift as the first half wore on, and Muncie added a pair of short touchdowns runs to make it a four-score game with barely 22 minutes played. The Raiders missed a field goal on the next drive, but Muncie fumbled on the next play, and the tide began to turn. Plunkett threw a 1-yard touchdown pass on 4th and goal, giving Los Angeles something to build on in the second half.

The Raiders' momentum continued after the break, with Marcus Allen scoring touchdowns either side of a Winslow fumble. San Diego drove into scoring position early in the 4th quarter, only for Benirschke to miss from 32 yards out. Los Angeles then drove 80 yards to take the lead with 5:54 to play.

Fouts responded by leading San Diego from their own 20 to the Raider 15; en route, Chandler converted a 3rd and 15 with a 24-yard catch. The drive ended when Fouts through a pass off his back foot while under heavy pressure - Vann McElroy made a comfortable end zone interception. After Allen ran for a first down, three further rushes left the Raiders facing a 4th down with 10 seconds on the clock. Ray Guy then struggled to handle a low snap, and was tackled at the Los Angeles 29 with 4 seconds still to play. Fouts threw a Hail Mary into the back of the end zone, which the Raiders batted down; Joiner was in the area, but couldn't make up the ground in time, catching the ball on the first bounce.

Fouts was 25 of 42 for 357 yards. Chandler caught 7 passes for 118 yards, while Winslow caught 8 for 105 yards.

Week 4: vs. Denver Broncos 

Kellen Winslow was the star as San Diego swept Denver for the first time since 1968. Muncie's 29-yard catch-and-run had the Chargers moving on the game's opening possession, but Brooks fumbled at the goal line. Denver recovered, and drove 65 yards the other way for a field goal. San Diego came straight back with a 13-play, 86-yard drive, ending with Winslow bobbling the ball multiple times before possessing it for just long enough to claim a 3-yard touchdown. Leroy Jones recovered a fumble two plays later, setting up a Benirschke field goal, before Winslow capped a 9-play, 86-yard drive by taking a catch over the middle and breaking away for a 28-yard touchdown.

Down 17-3, Denver recovered with consecutive touchdown drives either side of half time: Steve DeBerg threw for one touchdown and ran for another to tie the scores. Muncie's 34-yard reception was nullified by a penalty on the next drive, and the Chargers were forced to punt. Five consecutive possessions then resulted in turnovers, the last of these coming when Rick Ackerman sacked DeBerg, forcing a fumble that Keith Ferguson recovered at the Denver five-yard line. Muncie was stopped at the goal line on 3rd and goal, and the Chargers settled for a chip shot field goal.

After Denver levelled the scores early in the 4th quarter, Fouts led his team 87 yards to another touchdown, with completions of 28 yards to Joiner and 22 to John Cappelletti accounting for much of the yardage. Winslow pulled in a fade on 3rd and goal for what proved to be the winning score. Fox intercepted DeBerg on the next drive - he fumbled on the return but King recovered. After Brooks converted a 4th and 1, Benirschke hit the clinching field goal from 42 yards out with 55 seconds to play.

Fouts completed 27 of 40 for 337 yards, three touchdowns and an interception. It was his 27th 300-yard game, breaking a tie with former teammate Johnny Unitas for the most in a career. Winslow had 8 catches for 107 yards and 3 touchdowns, while Joiner had 7 for 121 yards.

Week 5: at Cleveland Browns 

Four first half rushing touchdowns saw the Chargers to a comfortable win. A Mike Williams interception and a 24-yard Brooks punt return set up the Charger offense with short fields for consecutive 1st quarter drives, both of which ended with 1-yard Muncie touchdowns. In the 2nd quarter, Muncie caught a 39-yard pass on an 80-yard touchdown drive - this time, it was Brooks who finished it from a yard out. Tim Fox intercepted Brian Sipe on the ensuing drive, and Brooks burst through the middle for an 11-yard score four plays later; it was 27–3 at halftime.

Cleveland possessed the ball for over 13 minutes on two 3rd quarter drives that saw them knock ten points off their deficit, but would get no closer, with Benirschke's insurance field goal the only score in the final quarter.

Keith Ferguson had two of the Charger's 4 sacks. Brooks gained 198 all-purpose yards.

Week 6: at San Francisco 49ers 

The lone career meeting between future Hall of Famers Dan Fouts and Joe Montana proved to be record-breaking. When it was over, San Diego had beaten the defending Super Bowl champions and dropped them to 2-4 on the year.

Following an early exchange of punts, the next seven drives all produced points. The Chargers struck first, going 80 yards in 7 plays; Fouts found a diving Chandler in the end zone for a 31-yard touchdown on 3rd and 8. Montana led San Francisco 74 yards in 8 plays in response, scoring himself when he spun out of an attempted Ferguson sack and scrambled in from the 11. Chandler appeared to have struck again on the next drive, but former Charger Fred Dean had drawn a holding penalty from Billy Shields; the score was wiped out, and San Diego settled for a field goal.

Running back Jeff Moore caught a 43-yard pass to open the next drive, and a 6-yard touchdown pass to finish it. James Brooks returned the ensuing kickoff 35 yards to the San Diego 40; after missing on one pass, Fouts then strung together four completions in a row, the final one a 25-yard touchdown to Eric Sievers. San Francisco responded with a game-tying field goal, leaving Fouts 2:07 to work with before halftime. He led the Chargers 85 yards in 11 plays, finding Chandler for a 25-yard completion and a 14-yard touchdown with 20 seconds on the clock.

Three plays into the second half, Montana was intercepted by Jeff Allen. The Chargers capitalised with a 59-yard touchdown drive to go 31-17 up: Chandler caught his third touchdown of the game from 20 yards, bobbling the ball before pulling it in while being pulled over by the back of his shirt. Montana responded on the next drive, converting a 4th and 3 with a 4-yard pass to Moore, before finding Freddie Solomon in the end zone for a 14-yard score. Benirschke's 50-yard field goal attempt missed narrowly to the right on the next drive, and San Francisco went 68 yards to score again, Bill Ring rushing 9 yards for a touchdown. However, Ray Wersching missed the extra point attempt, leaving San Diego up 31-30.

Fouts began the next drive with back-to-back 16- and 27-yard completions to Joiner, but Dean stuffed Muncie for a 5-yard loss on the next play. Two passes then fell incomplete in the end zone, Ronnie Lott dropping an interception on the first of these, and Benirschke kicked a 41-yard field goal to stretch the lead to four. San Francisco responded with their third consecutive touchdown drive, Dwight Clark catching the go-ahead pass in the front of the end zone, on 3rd and goal from the 7.

This time, the Chargers responded in kind. Joiner caught a 43-yard pass up the left sideline, and Muncie caught a 3-yard touchdown with 3:22 on the clock. Moore converted a 4th and inches on the next drive, but San Francisco soon found themselves facing a 4th and 10 on their own 31. Woodrow Lowe then intercepted Montana; Cappelletti ran for 17 yards on the next play, and the Chargers ran the clock out.

Fouts was 33 of 48 for 444 yards, five touchdowns and no interceptions, tying his career-high for single-game yards. Montana was 31 of 46 for 356 yards, three touchdowns and two interceptions. Neither quarterback was sacked. With Montana's backup also completing a ten-yard pass, there were 65 completions in total, a new NFL record. Montana broke a Fouts record with his fifth consecutive 300-yard game. San Diego had three 100-yard receivers: Joiner, 8 for 145; Chandler, 7 for 125, 3 touchdowns; Winslow, 9 for 101. The teams combined for 1003 offensive yards, with San Diego gaining 538.

Week 7: vs. Cincinnati Bengals 

For the second week in a row, San Diego defeated a reigning Conference Champion in a record-breaking passing duel. Unlike San Francisco, the Bengals entered the game in good form, 5-1 with their lone defeat having come in overtime.

Ken Anderson attempted passes on the first eight plays of the game, completing six of them as the Bengals reach 2nd and goal from the Charger one. Louie Kelcher then stuffed Pete Johnson for no gain, Anderson threw incomplete and Cincinnati settled for a field goal. Three plays into the Chargers' response, Muncie swept right before pulling up and launching a 66-yard touchdown pass to Chandler, who was wide open inside the 30. Anderson began the next drive with completions on five consecutive plays, and ended it by dodging Gary Johnson in the backfield and scrambling up the middle for a 12-yard touchdown.

Following an exchange of punts, both sides missed opportunities. Fouts converted a 3rd and 19 with a 22-yard completion to Joiner, but was intercepted going for the same player in the end zone. Cincinnati then moved to a 4th and 2 on the Chargers 33, but Johnson could only gain one yard and the ball was turned over on downs. Three plays later, an errant Fouts pass went straight to Bo Harris for an interception he returned 62 yards for a touchdown. The Chargers responded when Brooks swept left with a delayed handoff for a 17-yard touchdown, but Anderson was 9 of 9 on the next drive, including a 6-yard touchdown pass to Cris Collinsworth with 29 seconds to play in the half. That was just long enough for Fouts, who immediately found Chandler for 27 yards, and completed two more to reach the Bengal 24 with a second to play. Benirschke's kick made it 24-17 at halftime.

San Diego turned the game their way with 16 points in the first five minutes of the 3rd quarter. They went 82 yards with the first possession, Winslow gaining 40 of them with a single catch, and Muncie scored from a yard out. A penalty wiped out a long return of the ensuing kickoff, forcing the Bengals to start at their own 7; Gary Johnson burst into the backfield on the next play, and brought Anderson down for a go-ahead safety. Three plays after that, Chandler broke a tackle and took a short slant in for a 38-yard touchdown and a 33-24 lead. A 49-yard catch-and-run by Collinsworth set up a Bengal field goal, before Winslow appeared to have extended the lead with a 38-yard touchdown. It was ruled out by a holding penalty, but the Chargers scored anyway, Brooks going straight up the middle on a 48-yard rush with the Bengals caught in a blitz.

Late in the 3rd quarter, a Muncie fumble set up Anderson's second touchdown pass, but the Chargers took over from there. A 32-yard Winslow reception led to a Benirschke field goal, and a 43-34 lead. Anderson led his team to the Charger 28, but then committed the lone Bengal turnover of the day - Fox's interception and 41-yard return gave San Diego the ball in Cincinnati territory. Catches of 19- and 20-yards by Chandler were followed by Brooks' one-yard touchdown to make the game safe.

Fouts was 25 of 40 for 435 yards, a touchdown and two interceptions; Anderson completed 40 of 56 for 416 yards, two touchdowns and an interception. With Muncie's touchdown pass, there were 66 completions in total, breaking the record set in the previous Charger game. It was the first regular season game in which both quarterbacks passed for over 400 yards (it had also happened in the Epic in Miami); Fouts became the first man to pass for 400 yards in consecutive games. Chandler caught 10 passes for 260 yards (still a club record) and two touchdowns; Winslow caught 6 balls for 116 yards. Brooks had his lone 100-yard rushing game as a Charger, gaining 105 yards on 12 carries, with two touchdowns. The Chargers gained 661 yards, the most by any team for 24 years, and still a club record. The teams combined for 1102 yards, second-most in NFL history at the time, and 883 passing yards, a new record (since surpassed). The Chargers clinched a playoff berth with the win, the third consecutive season in which they'd done so on Monday Night Football.

Week 8: vs. Baltimore Colts 

For the third consecutive week, San Diego piled up 40+ points and 500+ yards; unlike their previous two opponents, the winless Colts lacked the firepower to make a close contest of it. Baltimore did manage to drive into Chargers territory on their first two possessions, but lost fumbles both times, with Cliff Thrift recovering both of them. Following the second of these, the Chargers drove 76 yards for the opening points, Winslow catching a 30-yard touchdown from Fouts. Benirschke added a field goal on the next Charger possession; this was followed by consecutive 4-play, 65-yard touchdown drives, with Chandler scoring his first touchdown (covering 41 yards) and Winslow his second (13 yards).

Down 23-0, the Colts produced a mini-comeback, taking advantage of a pair of Charger turnovers and scoring 13 points on three possessions sandwiched around halftime. The Chargers quickly shut down the threat, driving 75 yards in 9 plays without facing a third down, with Brooks running it in from the Baltimore 8. Following a Mike Williams interception, Chandler hauled in a 44-yard touchdown, and Winslow later added a 28-yarder.

Fouts was 18 of 30 for 298 yards, five touchdowns and an interception. Winslow caught 7 for 120 yards and three touchdowns, while Chandler scored twice and gained 118 yards on just 4 catches. Chuck Muncie gained 126 yards on 16 carries. San Diego became the first team to gain at least 500 yards in three consecutive games; their total of 1,706 yards from Week 6 through Week 8 remains a record for a three-game span.

Week 9: vs. Los Angeles Raiders 

Both teams had long-since clinched spots in the expanded playoffs, and were jockeying for position: the Chargers would be #2 with a win and #5 with a loss; Los Angeles could be as high as #1 or slip as far as #4. Wes Chandler continued his excellent form on the first San Diego drive, with catches of 27 yards (on 3rd and 17) and 21 yards setting up a Benirschke field goal. After Los Angeles put up the next ten points, Chandler drew a 43-yard pass interference penalty, giving San Diego a 1st and goal at the six. The drive stalled, and Benirschke missed a 20-yard chip shot.

Brooks returned the opening kickoff of the second half for 42 yards, but Mike Davis intercepted Fouts on the next play, and returned it 56-yard for a touchdown; when Los Angeles added a field goal on their next drive, it was 20-3. San Diego began their comeback quickly, Chandler starting their next drive with a 31-yard catch and finishing it two plays later with a 25-yard touchdown, catching the ball despite it being noticeably deflected by a defensive back en route. Carries of 15 and 13 yards by Muncie set up a field goal on the next drive, and Pete Holohan recovered a fumble on the ensuing kickoff. Starting at the Raider 19, Muncie caught a 16-yard pass (he lost the ball, but was controversially ruled down by contact) and finished the drive with a couple of runs up the middle. Level now, San Diego forced a punt after Keith Ferguson sacked Jim Plunkett, then went 80 yards in 7 plays to take the lead. Muncie had a 15-yard run, Winslow caught a 22-yard pass, and Muncie finished the job from a yard out.

Just as in their previous meeting with the Raiders, San Diego had achieved a run of 24 unanswered points. However, they would win neither game. Oakland tied the scores when Marcus Allen finished off an 87-yard drive with 5:24 to play. San Diego then reached a 3rd and 7 on their own 48, but Fouts threw another pick six, James Davis with a 52-yard runback. The Chargers failed on downs, and Allen added another touchdown. Fouts ran the ball in himself in response, but only 8 seconds remained, and San Diego didn't get the ball back.

Fouts completed 18 of 38 for 303 yards, a touchdown and two interceptions. Chandler had his fourth straight 100-yard game, with 6 catches for 138 yards and a touchdown. Muncie rushed 26 times for 129 yards and two touchdowns. Ferguson finished with 2.5 sacks. It was the fourth straight Charger game with at least 70 points scored, an unprecedented run.

Postseason

Game summaries

1st round: at Steelers 

Two 4th quarter touchdowns by Kellen Winslow gave San Diego their first win at Three Rivers Stadium.

2nd round: at Dolphins 

The powerful San Diego passing attack was shut down in the final playoff game for the principal stars of Air Coryell.

Standings

References

Notes

External links
1982 San Diego Chargers at pro-football-reference.com

San Diego Chargers
San Diego Chargers seasons
San Diego Chargers f